The 4th Seniors Rhythmic Gymnastics Asian Championships was held in Astana, Kazakhstan during 15 – 18 October 2009.

Medal winners

Medal table

Results

Team
The team final was held on 16 October 2010. The team final score was the total of top 10 scores.

Details

Individual All-around

Individual Rope

Individual Hoop

Individual Ball

Individual Ribbon

References

Rhythmic Gymnastics Asian Championships
International gymnastics competitions hosted by Kazakhstan
2009 in gymnastics
2009 in Kazakhstani sport